Kwanti Racecourse was a racecourse in Kwan Tei, in the northern New Territories of Hong Kong, which was active from 1926 to 1950. It was managed by the Fanling Hunt and Race Club.

External links
 Chung King Lam, Choi Ming Sum. "Racing and the City: Hong Kong's History of Urban Development and Spatial Planning with Three Racecourses"
 Kwanti Racecourse at racingmemories.hk
 Kwanti Racecourse at industrialhistoryhk.org
 Pictures of the Fanling Hunt Club and Kwanti Racecourse at Hong Kong Image Database

Horse racing venues in Hong Kong
Former buildings and structures in Hong Kong
Kwan Tei